The Ynares Center is an indoor sporting arena located along the Circumferential Road in Antipolo, Rizal, Philippines. The facility, which has a  seating capacity of 7,400, is managed by the Provincial Government of Rizal. Aside from hosting basketball, boxing, volleyball and other indoor sports, the Ynares Center is also used for concerts and other crowd gatherings.

The arena was built at a cost of ₱350 million. This is the current landmark in the province where PBA games and big concerts are held regularly.  The sporting venue situated in a  lot has an air-conditioning system installed. It also has 13 multi-purpose rooms, which includes the Offices of the Governor and Sangguniang Panlalawigan, Administration and Engineering and Equipment Room. Its also host a parking area with 440 slots.

This is also the site of the 100th Foundation Anniversary Celebration of the province. It has also hosted international events, such as the 2011 FIBA Asia Champions Cup. It was the home court of the Pasig-Rizal Pirates of the Metropolitan Basketball Association in 2000.

In June 2000, as part of the Jubilee Year celebration of the Catholic Church, the Diocese of Antipolo offered Mass at the center with Cardinal Jaime Sin, Archbishop of Manila, and Archbishop Antonio Franco, Apostolic Nuncio to the Philippines, who was then making a pastoral visit to the diocese. Mass was again offered at the center in 2005 to celebrate the National Eucharistic and Marian Year. The center was also the venue for a congress held in celebration of the same season. Former president Corazon Aquino and Bishop Teodoro Bacani were the main speakers. In 2007, the Diocese of Antipolo held a well-attended concert of its priests in the center. On December 5, 2008, the center was again the venue of a Mass and program celebrating the 25th anniversary of the canonical erection of the Diocese of Antipolo.

In late 2000, Manny Pacquiao won in 10 rounds against Nedal Hussein in an international title bout prior to his first match in the United States a few months later.

Ynares Center is also the home of the school pageant and school celebrations. Every year, Our Lady of Fatima University holds its founding anniversary there. Every year, schools in Antipolo compete in the Drum and Lyre Competition held usually in December.

The stadium is named after the Ynares family of Rizal, whose members had served as governors since 1992.

References

External links

 The Ynares Center

Basketball venues in the Philippines
Indoor arenas in the Philippines
Buildings and structures in Antipolo
Sports in Rizal